Cossoine is a comune (municipality) in the Province of Sassari in the Italian region Sardinia, located about  north of Cagliari and about  southeast of Sassari.

Cossoine borders the following municipalities: Bonorva, Cheremule, Giave, Mara, Padria, Pozzomaggiore, Romana, Semestene, Thiesi.
 
Sights include the churches of Santa Maria Iscalas, an example of Byzantine architecture (6th-11th centuries), and Santa Chiara, in Romanesque-Gothic-Aragonese style (16th century).

References 

Cities and towns in Sardinia